This is a list of regions and provinces of the Philippines by Human Development Index (HDI) as of 2019. The HDI is a statistic composite index of life expectancy, education (mean years of schooling completed and expected years of schooling upon entering the education system), and per capita income indicators, which is used to rank countries into four tiers of human development.

Regions
The HDI values below are based on the preliminary estimates of the 2019 Provincial Human Development Index by the Philippine Statistics Authority, as well as the Global Data Lab estimates published by the Radboud University Nijmegen Center for Economics.

Highs and lows 
All provinces surrounding Metro Manila have a high HDI value. Metro Manila, Benguet, Iloilo and Rizal already have very high HDI values (≥0.800). The southern region of Mindanao has three of the provinces with the lowest (low) HDI values (<0.550).

Provinces
The HDI values below are based on the preliminary estimates of the 2019 Provincial Human Development Index by the Philippine Statistics Authority.

See also
Poverty in the Philippines
List of Philippine provinces by population

References

Philippines
Provinces by HDI
Provinces by HDI
HDI
HDI
HDI
Provinces by HDI
Philippines, HDI